A minority religion is a religion held by a minority of the population of a country, state, or region. Minority religions may be subject to stigma or discrimination. An example of a stigma is using the term cult with its extremely negative connotations for certain new religious movements. People who belong to a minority religion may be subject to discrimination and prejudice, especially when the religious differences correlate with ethnic differences.

Laws are made in some countries to protect the rights of religious minorities, such as protecting the minorities' culture and to promote harmony with the majority.

See also
 Minority group
 Religious minorities in Greece
 Religious minorities in India
 Religious minorities in Iran
 Religious minorities in Iraq
 Religious minorities in Pakistan
 Religious minorities in Turkey

References 

Minorities
Religion and politics